Ježić is a Serbo-Croatian surname, derived from the word jež, meaning "hedgehog". Its bearers are mostly ethnic Croats. It may refer to:

 Josip Ježić (1899–1981), Croatian veterinarian, microbiologist, immunologist 
 Katarina Ježić (born 1992), Croatian handball player
 Mislav Ježić (born 1952), Croatian philosopher and Indologist
 Slavko Ježić (1895–1969), Croatian writer, historian and translator
 Zdravko Ježić (1931–2005), Croatian chemist and waterpolo player

See also
Jezić, surname
Jažić, surname

Croatian surnames